Mae bia (or The Snake Lady) is a 2001 Thai romance-horror film directed by Somching Srisuparp and starring Napakpapha Nakprasitte and Akara Amarttayakul.

This is a historical and culturally important film as it is of serious content and artistic merit to represent such output from the small Thailand feature film history.

Plot
Chanachol, recently returned to Thailand after living overseas, signs up for a tour to get back in touch with Thai culture, and finds himself attracted to the tour guide, Mekhala.

There are several problems with the relationship: Chanachol is married, with family, and Mekhala has a mysterious, symbiotic relationship with a deadly cobra, and many of her previous suitors have ended up dead. And the snake will come after Chanachol and kill him once and for all. Then Mekhala became so heartbroken she committed suicide by sub submerging herself in the very deep klong and never lived again. However, she appears again near the end of the film again as a tour guide on an antique tour boat.  She meets the younger brother who introduces her to another officer in the family business.  The man is entranced by her and her expression indicates she will love and her cobra will kill again.

Cast
 Napakpapha Nakprasitte as Mekahala
 Akara Amarttayakul as Chanachol
 Chotiros Kaewpini as Mai Kaew
 Apinan Pra as Poj
 Surang Sae-ung as Nuan
 Natsawas Mansap as Kosum

External links
 

2001 films
2001 horror films
Thai-language films
Films about snakes
Thai horror films
Romantic horror films
Natural horror films
2000s romance films